Artifact or artefact (British English) may refer to:

Science and technology
Artifact (error), misleading or confusing alteration in data or observation, commonly in experimental science, resulting from flaws in technique or equipment
 Compression artifact, a loss of clarity caused by the data compression of an image, audio, or video
 Digital artifact, any undesired alteration in data introduced during its digital processing
 Visual artifact, anomalies during visual representation of digital graphics and imagery
 In the scrum software project management framework, documentation used for managing the project

Archaeology
 Artifact (archaeology), an object formed by humans, particularly one of interest to archaeologists
 Cultural artifact, in the social sciences, anything created by humans which gives information about the culture of its creator and users
 The Artefact (journal), published annually by the Archaeological and Anthropological Society of Victoria

Computing
 Artifact (software development), one of many kinds of tangible by-products produced during the development of software
 Artifact (enterprise architecture), a separate component of enterprise architecture
 Virtual artifact, an object in a digital environment
 Artifact (UML), a term in the Unified Modeling Language

Arts and media

Film and television
 Artifact (film), a 2012 documentary film directed by Jared Leto under the pseudonym of Bartholomew Cubbins
 Artifacts (film), a 2007 horror film
 The Artifact (Eureka), a fictional object appearing in the TV series Eureka

Games
 Artifact (video game), a 2018 digital collectible card game by Valve
 Artifact (Magic: The Gathering), a card type in the trading card game Magic: The Gathering

Music
 Artifacts (Steve Roach album), 1994
 Artifacts (Nicole Mitchell album), 2015
 Artifacts (group), a hip-hop duo from New Jersey
 Artifact (album), a 2002 album by The Electric Prunes
 Artiifact, a 2016 album by South African hip hop record producer Anatii
 Artifact, a 2019 album by Swedish electronic musician Waveshaper
 Artifacts (Beirut album), 2022

Other media
 Artifact, a 1985 science fiction novel by Gregory Benford
 Artifact (ballet), 1984 ballet by William Forsythe

Other uses
 Learning artifact (education), an object created by students during the course of instruction
 Artifacting, a technique used on some older computers to generate color in monochrome modes by exploiting artifacts of analog television systems
 A relic, an object left behind by a prophet or other important religious figure

See also
 
 
 
 
 Object (disambiguation)
 Artifakt, a compilation album by Better Than Ezra
 Artifakts (bc), a 1998 album by Plastikman
 Different spellings and connotations for artefact or artifact
 Magic item, in fantasy, any object that has magical powers so powerful that it cannot be duplicated or destroyed by ordinary means